San Giacomo degli Schiavoni is a comune (municipality) in the Province of Campobasso in the Italian region Molise, located about  northeast of Campobasso.The settlement was formerly inhabited by an Arbëreshë community, who have since assimilated.

San Giacomo degli Schiavoni borders the following municipalities: Guglionesi, Termoli.

See also
 Molise Croats

References

Arbëresh settlements

Cities and towns in Molise